Satawali  is a census town in Lanja-Taluka  Ratnagiri district in the Indian state of Maharashtra.

Satavali is a village about 12 miles up the Muchkundi Creek, surrounded, though not shut in, by high hills. It is a very beautiful village situated 19 km away from Bombay-Goa highway. The village is in a valley with a river called Muchkundi.

The speciality of the village is its unity of Hindu-Muslim religions.

The main income sources are mango trees and rice farming. Due to the river it is not surprising to see some fish hunters at the bank of Muchkundi.
three Marathi, One Urdu schools and a high school & junior college are the education sources and are expert enough to provide good future to its students.

There are old paved roads and Musalman remains. [Nairne's Konkan, 33] Close to the river is a small fort with six bastions and about a fifth of an acre in area. There is a village panchayat at Satavali

Nearby cities: Lanja, Rajapur and Ratnagiri

Geography
Satawali is located at coordinates:   16°45'53"N   73°27'22"  It has an average elevation of 166 metres (544 feet).

The village is in Taluka Lanja - Ratnagiri district.  The national highway popularly known as Mumbai-Goa Highway passes through it. Nearest rail head is Adivali on Konkan Railway which is about 35 km away.

History
From the time of the Peshva up to 1 August 1879, Satwali was made a sub-division.

Demographics
Population is more than 12000.

Institutions
Satwali village Village has branches of Bank of India, (est.1969), Ratnagiri District Central Bank. There is a ZP Hospital and a 4 ST Bus Stand.

Climate
The temperatures are often below 10 °C in winters.  In summer temperatures jump up to 40 °C.

References

Cities and towns in Ratnagiri district
Talukas in Maharashtra